Cézanne is a script typeface based on Paul Cézanne's handwriting. The typeface includes alternate characters and swashes. It was created for the Philadelphia Museum of Art by designers Michael Want and Richard Kegler and published by P22 type foundry in 1996.

See also

 List of typefaces

References

Script typefaces
Typefaces and fonts introduced in 1996